Kombori is a department or commune of Kossi Province in western Burkina Faso. Its capital lies at the town of Kombori. According to the 1996 census the department has a total population of 9,610.

Towns and villages

 Kombori	(1 586 inhabitants) (capital)
 Abaye	(791 inhabitants)
 Aourèma	(584 inhabitants)
 Ba-Peulh	(127 inhabitants)
 Daga	(201 inhabitants)
 Gani	(623 inhabitants)
 Kolonkani-Ba	(218 inhabitants)
 Konna	(857 inhabitants)
 Lonani	(239 inhabitants)
 Magadian	(1 083 inhabitants)
 Ouori	(571 inhabitants)
 Sanakadougou	(978 inhabitants)
 Sassambari	(321 inhabitants)
 Siekoro	(455 inhabitants)
 Siewali	(301 inhabitants)
 Siguidé	(150 inhabitants)
 Yaran	(525 inhabitants)

References

Departments of Burkina Faso
Kossi Province